The KB SAT SR-10 is a prototype Russian single-engine jet trainer aircraft, fitted with forward-swept wings. It first flew in 2015 and is being offered to the Russian Air Force and for export.

Design and development

The Russian design bureau KB SAT (Sovremyenne Aviatsyonne Tekhnologii – Modern Aircraft Technologies) began work on a single-engine jet trainer and sport aircraft, the SR-10, in 2007, displaying a mockup at the MAKS airshow at Zhukovsky in  August 2009. The SR-10 is a mid-wing monoplane of all-composite construction, with a wing swept forward at an angle of 10 degrees. The crew of two sit in a tandem cockpit. It is powered by a single turbofan, with an Ivchenko AI-25V AI25TSR (modification of AI25TL) fitted in the prototype, but more modern Russian engines, such as the NPO Saturn AL-55 were proposed for production aircraft.

The SR-10 was offered to meet a 2014 requirement for a basic trainer for the Russian Air force, but was rejected in favour of the Yakovlev Yak-152, a piston-engined trainer. Despite this setback, KB SAT continued to develop the SR-10, proposing it as an intermediate trainer between the Yak-152 and the Yak-130 advanced jet trainer and for export. The first prototype SR-10 made its maiden flight on 25 December 2015.

In July 2017, KB SAT announced that it had developed an unmanned variant of the aircraft named the AR-10 Argument.

In September 2018, according to media reports, the Russian government failed to allocate funds to start production of SR-10 for the Russian Air Force and as a result KB SAT suspended all work on the project.

On September 19, 2020 SR-10 took part in the "Russian Aviation Race", held at the Oreshkovo airfield (Kaluga oblast)

Specifications (SR-10)

See also

References

External links

 "New Russian forward-swept wing jet trainer has made its first flight. And here’s the video". The Aviationist. 2 January 2016.
 KB-SAT official site (in Russian)

2010s Russian military trainer aircraft
Aircraft first flown in 2015
Forward-swept-wing aircraft